James Henry Hackett (March 15, 1800 – December 28, 1871) was an American actor.

Hackett was born in New York City. He entered Columbia College in 1815 but withdrew. He then studied law privately. In 1818, he became a wholesale clerk in a grocery firm in New York. In 1819, he married Catherine Leebuff, a young actress. After an unsuccessful entry into business, he went on the stage in March 1826 playing the role of Justice Woodcock in Love of a Village. He played opposite his wife in the play. He soon established a reputation as a player of eccentric character parts. The next year, he played at the Covent Garden in London with success. He traveled back and forth between the United States and Britain, achieving a reputation in the works of Shakespeare, particularly Falstaff. In 1834 he commissioned a play from writer John Neal to suit his strength with eccentric characters but rejected the comedy upon receipt.

As a manager and impresario, he is remembered, among other things, for having engaged the troupe of Italian opera singers who formed the nucleus of the first season (1854–55) of the Academy of Music in New York City. After that, he appeared only rarely on the public stage.
He was the author of Notes and Comments on Shakespeare (1863).

He was the father of Recorder John K. Hackett and actor James Keteltas Hackett.

Hackett died on December 28, 1871, in Jamaica, Long Island, New York.

Notes and references

External links

 

1800 births
1871 deaths
American male stage actors
Male actors from New York City
19th-century American male actors
Columbia College (New York) alumni